Alexeyevka is a rural locality (a selo) in Samosdelsky Selsoviet, Kamyzyaksky District, Astrakhan Oblast, Russia. The population was 201 as of 2010. There are three streets.

Geography 
Alexeyevka is located 38 km southwest of Kamyzyak (the district's administrative centre) by road. Arshin is the nearest rural locality.

References 

Rural localities in Kamyzyaksky District